Stonegate or Stone Gate may refer to:

Businesses 
 Stonegate Bank, United States
 Stonegate Pub Company, United Kingdom

Film 
 The Stone Gate, a 1992 romance in Croatian

Places

England 
 Stonegate (York), a historic street
 Stonegate, East Sussex
 Stonegate railway station
 Stonegate, Scarborough, a location in North Yorkshire

United States 
 Stonegate, Colorado
 Stonegate, Fort Worth, Texas
 Stonegate Village, California, in El Dorado County
 Stonegate, a neighborhood of Davis, California
 Stonegate, a neighborhood of Irvine, California

Elsewhere 
Stone Gate, a landmark in Zagreb, Croatia
 Stonegate-Queensway, a neighbourhood of Toronto, Canada